International TAKIFUJI Art Award is an art award for students who belong to the designated art schools.

The applicants are evaluated and screened based on their works produced during their studies, by their supervisors' recommendations, and by judges by the leading figures in Japan art world. Scholarships as "grants for production activities" are given to the winners who are selected by at least one from each school. It is hosted by Japan Traffic Culture Association, a nonprofit organization in Japan, and was established in 1980 as TAKIFUJI Art Award (later changed to International TAKIFUJI Art Award).

Designated schools 
 China: Academy of Arts and Design, Tsinghua University
 France: École nationale supérieure des Beaux-Arts
 Germany: Berlin University of the Arts, Stuttgart State Academy of Art and Design
 Japan: Aichi University of the Arts, Hiroshima City University, Joshibi University of Art and Design, Kanazawa College of Art, Kyoto City University of Arts, Kyoto University of Art and Design, Musashino Art University, Nihon University, Okinawa Prefectural University of Arts, Tama Art University, Tohoku University of Art and Design, Tokyo University of the Arts, Tokyo Zokei University
 Korea: Ewha Womans University, Hongik University, Seoul National University
 Singapore: Lasalle College of the Arts
 United Kingdom: University of the Arts London, University of London
 United States: Art Center College of Design, Pratt Institute

Award winners 
 Yoshitomo Nara (1984)
 Kenji Yanobe (1988)

External links 
 International TAKIFUJI Art Award, Japan Traffic Culture Association

Visual arts awards
International art awards